Mónica Naranjo Carrasco (born 23 May 1974) is a Spanish singer widely popular in Spain and Latin America and recognised as one of the most powerful voices of the Spanish and Latin American music scenes. She has performed with singers such as Luciano Pavarotti, Rocío Jurado and Mina Mazzini amongst others.

Biography

Early years 
Mónica Naranjo was born in Figueres. Her parents, Francisco, a construction worker and Patricia a housewife, migrated from southern Spain (Seville) and (Málaga) to the north in the 1960s. Mónica, who is the oldest daughter of the family has two younger siblings, Raquel and Enrique. Despite her troubled childhood, when she was only 4, she realised that music was her favourite activity.

At the age of 14, the young Mónica enrolled a music school to learn singing and she also was given a voice recorder as a present so that she could start composing and recording her own songs.

Career 
She started singing at a very young age. Cristóbal Sánsano became her first producer. At 18, she emigrated to Mexico.

In 1994, she recorded her debut album, the self-titled Mónica Naranjo, after signing with Sony Music. The album resulted in the hit singles "Sola", "Solo se vive una vez", "El amor coloca", "Supernatural", "¡Óyeme!" and "Fuego de pasión". She was nominated for Eres Awards. Although the album went almost unnoticed in Spain, it had a great reception in Mexico, where it sold more than 900,000 copies.

In 1997, taking advantage of her popularity in Latin America, she released her second album, Palabra de Mujer. This time, the album was a hit not only in Mexico, but also in Spain, her home country. Managing to sell more than 2,000,000 copies. This success in Spain enabled the singer to return to her home country, and to perform in numerous TV programmes. The album was also successful in the United States, Latin America, thanks to singles such as "Entender el amor", "Desátame", "Pantera en libertad" and "Las campanas del amor". Due to the success of this album, she was awarded with the Amigo Award for the best Spanish female solo artist.

In 2000 she released her third album, Minage, a tribute to the Italian singer Mina. In an interview that year, she mentioned that the album was like nothing her producers expected:They were expecting another Palabra de Mujer album, but more than just a hit, I wanted something to let the world know that I am also a fanatic, and that there are many great artists/singers out there who deserve more recognition. An example of such an artist is Mina Mazzini.Minage was known for the song "Sobreviviré", a hit song that would turn into one of the most remembered and representative hits of the singer. This song, which is a cover of Mina Mazzini's "Fiume azurro" is not only considered a fight song, but also an LGTB anthem and a hymn against domestic violence. She performed that song during the "Pavarotti and Friends" gala, where she also performed "Agnus dei" in a duet with the Italian tenor.

In 2001, she released Chicas Malas, an album with several collaborations, among them Diane Warren, Gregg Alexander, John Reid, Cliff Masterson, Sam Watters, and many more. Having such worldwide-known influences, the commercial dance album sales were disappointing, having sold only 120,000 copies in its first year, making it the lowest-selling studio album in her Spanish-singing career.

In 2002, she decided to make a big leap into the English language public by recording the English version of "Chicas Malas" named "Bad Girls". The international push met very little support, although the song "I Ain't Gonna Cry" did get Mónica some recognition in continental Europe.

Hiatus 
After feeling overwhelmed by the music industry in general, and after thinking about her own personal life and career, the performer took the decision of moving away from the stages.

In 2005, after a long musical rest, Mónica briefly returned with a greatest hits album, Colección Privada, a big success that also included one new release "Enamorada de ti". With this album, Mónica closed a stage in her life and career. In December 2005, she sang "Punto de partida" as a duet with Rocío Jurado in a TV homage titled Rocío... Siempre.

Return 
On 29 February 2008, her new single Europa was officially launched on her official site climbing to No. 1 in the Spanish Single Charts. The Album Tarántula was made available in stores on 22 April 2008. This album, which marked her return to music after almost seven years reached number 1 in Spain, and was certified Platinum. Later, she released a limited special edition of the album, with a DVD and a photographic book of pictures of the Tarántula era.

Following the success of her latest album Tarántula, Mónica Naranjo embarked on the tour Adagio Tour in which she offered a new vision of her songs and symphonic CD + DVD is a reflection of this journey. The concert included in this album was recorded on 16 October 2009 at the Teatro de la Ciudad de México, with the Philharmonic Orchestra of Mexico City, one of the most prestigious in America, directed by Pepe Herrero, who also signed the new orchestral arrangements. The 16-track CD was mixed and mastered by John M. Vinader. It was released in Mexico and the U.S.

Thanks to the success of Tarántula, in 2010 the singer partnered with Studio Kawaii, (a Madrid-based studio specialised in manga style comics) and released simultaneously two comics, the semiautobiographical "Amor y lujo" and the fictional and futuristic "Todo mentira". Some years she started new projects and also released a recipe book.

In 2011, she sang the theme song for Mexican telenovela Emperatriz and in 2012, she released A Opera-Rock, accompanying a novel in Spanish with a few strokes in other languages. It was co-produced by Mónica and by Óscar Tarruella, and arrangements were by Pepe Herrero and Chris Gordon. The release originally due in 2010 was postponed for release to February 2016 which finally had the title of Lubna, based on a same name novel.

New projects 
In 2014, Mónica was part of the jury of the programme Tu cara me suena (Your face sounds familiar to me) which was broadcast by Antena 3. That same year, she was also a juror in the Spanish selection for the Eurovision Song Contest, which was won by Ruth Lorenzo, with whom she would perform in future concerts.

In 2017, she was also a juror in Operación Triunfo 2018, whose participation was controversial due to her sincere but also severe critics to the participating performers.

In 2019, Mónica debuted her new television show called Mónica y el Sexo (Sex and Mónica) on which the performer talks openly about the problems brought by her recent divorce from Óscar Tarruella who had been her husband for 16 years. Her song "Tú y yo y el loco amor" (You and me and that crazy love) was released as the principal song of the OST of the same name film. After that, she started working in a new project called "Mes Excentricités", a project that will be split in three EP's, of which the first one, entitled "Le psiquiatrique" will be released in middle 2019. The first single entitled "Doble Corazón" will be released during the Gay Pride parade in Madrid.

In 2020, the singer presented the popular but at the same time controversial reality show "La isla de las tentaciones" (Temptation island) and also performed the opening theme of the program. At the same time, she worked on the second volume of the EP series "Mes Excentricités" entitled "Les quatre saisons". This second volume will feature a cover of Radiohead's song Creep.

Monica Naranjo released her new single from the new album, Mimétika, which will be released in 2022, "Lagrimas de un Angel" on November 4.

Discography

Studio albums

Compilations

Live albums

Singles

(—) means the singles did not chart or were not eligible to chart, as they were sent only as a promo to radios.

Tours

 1995/1996 – Mónica Naranjo Tour (America)
 1998 – Tour Palabra de mujer (Spain/America)
 2000 – Tour Minage (Spain)
 2008 – Tarántula Tour (Spain)
 2009/2010 – Adagio Tour (Spain/America)
 2011/2012 – Madame Noir (Spain/America)
 2014 – Mónica Naranjo: 4.0 Tour (Spain)
 2019/2020 – Mónica Naranjo: Renaissance (Spain/America)

Other works

Television 
 El Número Uno, Antena 3 (2012). Judge. 
 Mira quien va a Eurovisión, TVE (2014). Judge.
 Tu cara me suena, Antena 3 (2014–2017). Judge.
 Operación Triunfo 2017, TVE (2017–2018). Judge.
 Mónica y el Sexo, Cuatro (2019). Host. 
 La isla de las tentaciones, Cuatro (2019). Host.
 Love Never Lies, Netflix (2021–present). Host.
 Benidorm Fest 2023, TVE (2023). Host.

Other releases 

 Amor y lujo, with Studio Kawaii (Manga) (2008)
 Todo mentira, With Studio Kawaii (Manga) (2010)
 Come y calla (Recipe book) (2013)

References

1974 births
Living people
Naranjo, Monica
21st-century Spanish singers
21st-century Spanish women singers
Sony Music Spain artists
Women in Latin music